Get Me Home is the second studio album from Australian singer Jade MacRae. Originally scheduled for release on 5 November 2007, the release date was pushed back on numerous occasions but finally saw a release on 4 October 2008.

Track listing
 Emergency
 Low
 Run to You
 I Wanna Be In Love
 Get Me Home
 In the Basement (Album Version)
 Trouble
 Shine Like a Diamond
 You're Gone
 Next to Me
 Under the Sheets
 Final Chapter
 Fly Away
iTunes Bonus Track
14 Shoulda Loved You More

Original release track list
 Run to You (A Newman/J MacRae)
 Low (A Newman/J MacRae)
 In the Basement (J MacRae/A Birgisson)
 You're Gone (A Newman/J MacRae)
 Get Me Home (A Wollbeck/M Lindblom/J MacRae)
 Under the Sheets (A Newman/J MacRae)
 Trouble (A Newman/J MacRae)
 Fly Away (A Newman/J MacRae)
 Emergency (A Newman/J MacRae)
 Next to Me (J MacRae/D A Hawes/B Edwards)
 Shine Like a Diamond (W Campbell/J MacRae)
 Final Chapter (A Newman/J MacRae)

Singles
In late 2007, the first single "In the Basement" failed to grab attention and only peaked at #60 on the ARIA single charts. Almost a year later second single "I Wanna Be in Love" was released to radio on 21 July, and was a digital single only. It has failed to make any impact, on any chart.

Release history

References

2008 albums